Johann Kropfgans (Kropffgans, Kropffganss; 14 October 1708 – c. 1770) was a German lutenist and composer.

Kropfgans was born in Breslau into the family of Johann Kropfgans Sr. He and his siblings Johanna Eleonora (b. 1710) and Johann Gottfried (b. 1714) all played the lute from a young age. He was a pupil of Silvius Leopold Weiss, with whom he visited Johann Sebastian Bach in 1739.

Kropfgans composed in the homophonic galant style. He wrote solo lute music as well as chamber music.

Bibliography
 Farstad, Per Kjetil, German galant lute music in the 18th century, Göteborg University, Dept. of Musicology, 2000, p. 333
 Bukofzer, Manfred F., Music in the Baroque Era, from Monteverdi to Bach, W.W. Norton & Company, November 1947, 
 The New Grove Dictionary of Music and Musicians, Groves Dictionaries, Inc., January 2004, 
 The Oxford Dictionary of Music, Oxford University Press, 2012,

External links
 Biography on Last.fm
 Oxford index

German Baroque composers
German lutenists
German classical composers
German male classical composers
18th-century classical composers
18th-century German composers
18th-century German male musicians
1708 births
1770 deaths
People from Austrian Silesia
Musicians from Wrocław